Aruvi is a 2021 Indian-Tamil language family drama television series, which premiered on 18 October 2021 in Sun TV and digitally streams on Sun NXT, starring Jovita Livingston Jones and Karthik Vasu in lead roles and Ambika in pivotal role. The serial is remake of Kannada television serial Kasthuri Nivasa which is being aired on Udaya TV, however it has a different narration later.

Plot
This is the story of strict and strong mother in law Saraswasthy who is having a motherless girl Aruvi as her daughter in law. Aruvi is a cool girl who accidentally fall for Pugazh, son of Saraswathy. She is initially being separated from Saraswathi and always her sister-in-law Neelaveni and her daughter Vennila used to irritate her but later they are convinced that Aruvi is the daughter in law of the house and accept her. Now everyone in the family is happy. Aruvi becomes pregnant but it got aborted due to her unexpected accident on her way to the hospital. This is somehow revealed to everyone in the family but Pugazh(Aruvi's husband), still thinks that Aruvi is pregnant and their baby is in her womb.Will Pugazh get to know the truth and how he reacts for it is going to be shown in the upcoming episodes

Cast

Main Cast
 Jovita Jones as Aruvi Shanmugam Pugazhendhi: Sivasankari and Shanmugam 's daughter, Saraswathi and Sivakumar 's Younger daughter- in - law, Pugazh 's wife 
 Karthick Vasudevan as Pugazhendhi Sivakumar: Saraswathi and Sivakumar's Younger son, Aruvi 's husband, Shamugam 's Maternal uncle.
 Ambika as Saraswathi Sivakumar: Shanmugam 's sister, Neelaveni, Eshwararamoorthy, Kalaiselvan and Pugazhendhi's mother, Sivakumar's wife.

Supporting
 Eshwar Ragunathan as Eshwaramoorthy Sivakumar: Saraswathi and Sivakumar's elder son,Lakshmi's husband, Shanmugam 's maternal uncle.
Lavanya Devi as Lakshmi Eshwar: Saraswathi and Sivakumar's first daughter-in-law,       Eshwaramoorthy's first wife
 VJ Sam as Kalaiselvan Sivakumar: Saraswathi and Sivakumar's second son, Indhu's husband, Shanmugam 's Maternal uncle. 
 Kirithika Laddu as Indhu Kalai: Saraswathi and Sivakumar's second daughter-in-law, Kalai's wife
 Supergood Kannan as Sivakumar: Shanmugam 's uncle, Neelaveni, Eshwaramoorthy, Kalaiselvan and Pugazhendhi's father, Saraswathi's husband.
 Swapna Sharath as Neelaveni Sivakumar Neelakandeswaran: Shanmugam 's Maternal uncle,Saraswathi and Sivakumar's daughter.(Main Antagonist)
 jayaraman Mohan as Shanmugam: (Saraswathi 's sister Sivasankari 's husband, Aruvi and Shailu 's father) 
 Soniya Vikram as Vennila: Neelaveni's daughter
 Girish as Vishwanathan: Sivasankari 's brother,Aruvi 's Maternal uncle 
 Jeevitha as Sivasankari Shanmugam: Shanmugam 's Wife, Aruvi and Shailu biological mother. 
 Divya Krishnan as Shyleshwari Shanmugam Eshwaramoorthy alias Shailu: Sivasankari and Shanmugam 's daughter, Saraswathi and Sivakumar's first daughter-in-law,Eshwaramoorthy's second wife
 Gokul Thilak as Neelakandeswaran: Neelaveni's husband 
 Pavan replacement Merwen Balaji as Veera Neelakandan: Vennila's brother 
 Surjith Ansary as Rocky: Vennila's fiancee
 A.Ramachandran as Sagayam 
 Tom Frank as Joseph "Joe" 
 Sathya Devarajan as Malarvizhi "Malar": Aruvi's best friend 
 Manishika Vijay as Pooja Eshwaramoorthy
 Vijeesh A.L as Ragul
 'Araathi' Balaji Sha as “Inderjeet” 
 Poorni AnnaPoorni as Gayathri 
 Vidhun as Vikram "Vicky"
 Jillu Vikram as Bharadhan: Rocky's brother (deceased)

Special Appearances 
 Kasthuri as Herself 
 Krishna as Himself 
 Shruthi Raj as Herself
 Priyanka Nalkari as Roja
 Vadivukkarasi as Annapoorani
 Papri Ghosh as Kayal
 Krithika Annamalai as Revathy
 Nesan Nepolean as Raja Sundaram
 Mohammad Absar as Nalla Sundharam 
 Guhan Shanmugam as Anbu Sundaram
 Naresh Eswar as Kutty Sundaram

Soundtrack
It was sung by Rakshita Suresh. The first opening song was unveiled on 16 October 2021 on Sun TV and YouTube.

Soundtrack

Adaptations

References

External links 
 Aruvi serial on Sun TV

Sun TV original programming
Tamil-language romance television series
2021 Tamil-language television series debuts
Tamil-language television series based on Kannada-language television series
Television shows set in Tamil Nadu
Tamil-language television soap operas
Tamil-language television shows